Thomas Alexander Sharp (born 30 July 1957) is a Scottish retired professional footballer who played in the Football League for Brentford as a defender. He began his career at Everton and captained the youth team.

Career statistics

References

1957 births
Scottish footballers
English Football League players
Brentford F.C. players
Living people
People from Newmains
Association football defenders
Everton F.C. players
Sportspeople from Wishaw
Footballers from North Lanarkshire